is a Buddhist temple located in Kyoto, Japan. The temple is known for its garden, whose maple trees offer a colourful view in autumn.

Location and access
The temple is located in Kamitakano, Sakyō-ku, Kyoto on the left bank of Takano River, below the west side of Mount Hiei. It can be accessed by public transport via bus or Eizan Electric Railway through Yase-Hieizanguchi Station.

References

External links

Rurikō-in official website

Buddhist temples in Kyoto Prefecture